Asprokampos is a village of the Grevena municipality. Before the 1997 local government reform it was a part of the community of Myrsina. The 2011 census recorded 80 residents in the village. Asprokampos is a part of the local community of Myrsina.

Demographics
According to the 2011 census, the population of the settlement of Asprokampos was 80 people, a decrease of almost 30% compared to the previous census of 2001.

See also
 List of settlements in the Grevena regional unit

References

Populated places in Grevena (regional unit)